Kenilworth is a census-designated place in northern Carbon County, Utah, United States.

Description
The community lies at the eastern end of State Route 157, north of the city of Price, the county seat of Carbon County. Kenilworth has a post office with the ZIP code 84529. The population was 180 at the 2010 census.

History
Like many communities in Carbon County, Kenilworth began as a coal mining camp. Coal was first discovered in the area in 1904, and the town site was laid out in 1908. The name Kenilworth was given by British miners who thought the mountain peaks overlooking the area resembled the spires of Kenilworth Castle.

Demographics
The population was about 500 in 1910, rose to a high of 1,050 in 1947, and at the 1990 census was down to 350.

As of the census of 2010, there were 180 people living in the CDP. There were 112 housing units. The racial makeup of the town was 92.8% White, 5.0% from some other race, and 2.2% from two or more races. Hispanic or Latino of any race were 20.0% of the population.

Climate
This climatic region is typified by large seasonal temperature differences, with warm to hot (and often humid) summers and cold (sometimes severely cold) winters.  According to the Köppen Climate Classification system, Kenilworth has a humid continental climate, abbreviated "Dfb" on climate maps.

Gallery

See also

 List of census-designated places in Utah

References

External links

Census-designated places in Carbon County, Utah
Company towns in Utah
Mining communities in Utah
Populated places established in 1908
1908 establishments in Utah
Census-designated places in Utah